Unspun with Matt Forde is a British political satire television series hosted by comedian Matt Forde. The first series was broadcast from 14 September to 19 October 2016 on Dave.

The show features a house band, MP4, a rock band composed of British politicians.

Unspun began its second series on 1 March 2017, which concluded on 5 April 2017. The third series started on 17 May 2017, and ended on 7 June 2017. The fourth series started on 28 January 2018, and ended on 18 March 2018.

Episodes

Series overview

Series 1 (2016)

Series 2 (2017)

Series 3 (2017)

Series 4 (2018)

Notes

References

External links

2016 British television series debuts
2018 British television series endings
2010s British satirical television series
Dave (TV channel) original programming
English-language television shows
Television shows shot at Elstree Film Studios